The yellow-billed loon (Gavia adamsii), also known as the white-billed diver, is the largest member of the loon or diver family. Breeding adults have a black head, white underparts and chequered black-and-white mantle. Non-breeding plumage is drabber with the chin and foreneck white. Its main distinguishing feature is the long straw-yellow bill which, because the culmen is straight, appears slightly uptilted.

It breeds in the Arctic and winters mainly at sea along the coasts of the northern Pacific Ocean and northwestern Norway; it also sometimes overwinters on large inland lakes. It occasionally strays well south of its normal wintering range, and has been recorded as a vagrant in more than 22 countries. This species, like all divers, is a specialist fish-eater, catching its prey underwater. Its call is an eerie wailing, lower pitched than the common loon.

Taxonomy and etymology

First described by English zoologist George Robert Gray in 1859 based on a specimen collected in Alaska, the yellow-billed loon is a monotypic species, with no subspecies despite its large Holarctic range. It is closely related to the common loon, which it strongly resembles in plumage and behaviour; some taxonomists consider the two species to be allopatric forms of the same superspecies. Both are thought to have evolved from a population of black-throated loons which colonized the Nearctic and were subsequently cut off from other populations.

The genus name Gavia comes from the Latin for "sea mew", as used by ancient Roman naturalist Pliny the Elder. The specific epithet adamsii honours Edward Adams, a British naval surgeon and naturalist who sketched and collected numerous species, including this one, on several trips to the Arctic. The word "loon" is thought to have derived from the Swedish lom, the Old Norse or Icelandic lómr, or the Old Dutch loen, all of which mean "lame" or "clumsy", and is a probable reference to the difficulty that all loons have in moving about on land. "Diver" refers to the family's underwater method of hunting for prey, while "yellow-billed" and "white-billed" are references to the bird's distinctively pale bill.

Description

The adult is primarily black and white in breeding plumage, with a purple gloss on its head and neck.

Habitat and range
The yellow-billed loon is an Arctic species, breeding primarily along the coasts of the Arctic Ocean as far north as 78° N and wintering on sheltered coastal waters of the northern Pacific Ocean and the northwestern coast of Norway. It has been recorded as a breeding bird in Russia, Canada and the United States. Though it winters primarily to the north of 50° N, its winter range extends south to 35° N off the coast of Japan, and it has been recorded as a vagrant in more than 20 countries, including some as far south as Mexico and Spain.

Behaviour

Breeding
Like other loons, it forms long-lasting pairs. Though it prefers freshwater pools or lakes in the tundra, the yellow-billed loon will also breed along rivers, estuaries or the coast in low-lying areas of the Arctic; in general, it avoids forested areas. Breeding typically starts in early June, though it is dependent on the timing of the spring thaw. Like all members of its family, the yellow-billed loon builds a nest of plant material very close to the edge of the water. Copulation takes place on land, without any specific courtship. The pair defends its large territory intensively against intruders, but may later in the breeding season gang up with other birds on good fishing spots.

The eggs are strongly oval, and are a light purple-brown with darker blotches interspersed. This colour camouflages with the soil and vegetation that this bird nests near. Most of the time, however, the egg is not visible due to incubation, which takes around 27 to 29 days.

Feeding
The yellow-billed loon is a specialist fish eater, yet it also takes crustaceans, molluscs and annelids, especially for its young. It dives in pursuit of prey, which is caught underwater. Probably as a way to avoid spreading parasites, it defecates ashore, in the breeding lake.

Conservation and threats
In 2010, the IUCN (International Union for the Conservation of Nature) changed the status of the yellow-billed loon from Least Concern to Near Threatened, as the species appears to be in a "moderately rapid" population decline. An unsustainable level of subsistence harvesting by indigenous peoples was specifically named as the main threat.

The yellow-billed loon is one of the species to which the Agreement on the Conservation of African-Eurasian Migratory Waterbirds (AEWA) applies; in the Americas, it is protected by the Migratory Bird Treaty Act of 1918.

References

Citations

Bibliography
Sjölander, Sverre. The reproductive Behavior of the Yellow-billed Loon, Gavia adamsii. (With G. Ågren). The Condor 78:454-463. 1976.

Further reading

Identification

External links

 Flicker Field Guide Birds of the World Photographs
 
 
 
 
 

yellow-billed loon
Birds of the Arctic
Holarctic birds
yellow-billed loon
yellow-billed loon